The Charming Quirks of Others is the seventh book in The Sunday Philosophy Club Series by Alexander McCall Smith.

Plot
Isabel Dalhousie is approached by the wife of a trustee of a prestigious Scottish school concerning a poison pen letter that her husband, a trustee of said school, has received, concerning one of the candidates for the post of headmaster.

Isabel's nieces, Cat, has a new boyfriend who is, coincidentally, one of the candidates for the aforementioned position.

Isabel works in her usual manner to get to the bottom of the mystery.

References

2007 British novels
Novels by Alexander McCall Smith
Novels set in Edinburgh
2007 in Scotland
Little, Brown and Company books